The 2021 Texas State Bobcats softball team represented Texas State University during the 2020 NCAA Division I softball season. The Bobcats played their home games at Bobcat Softball Stadium. The Bobcats were led by twenty-first year head coach Ricci Woodard and were members of the Sun Belt Conference.

Preseason

Sun Belt Conference Coaches Poll
The Sun Belt Conference Coaches Poll was released on February 8, 2021. Texas State was picked to finish third in the Sun Belt Conference with 72 votes.

Preseason All-Sun Belt team
Summer Ellyson (LA, SR, Pitcher)
Leanna Johnson (TROY, SO, Pitcher)
Allisa Dalton (LA, SR, Shortstop/3rd Base)
Katie Webb (TROY, SR, Infielder/1st Base)
Raina O'Neal (LA, JR, Outfielder)
Julie Raws (LA, SR, Catcher)
Courtney Dean (CCU, SR, Outfielder)
Mekhia Freeman (GASO, SR, Outfielder)
Korie Kreps (ULM, JR, Outfielder)
Kaitlyn Alderink (LA, SR, 2nd Base)
Jade Gortarez (LA, SR, Shortstop/3rd Base)
Ciara Bryan (LA, SR, Outfielder)
Kelly Horne (TROY, SO, Infielder/2nd Base)
Makiya Thomas (CCU, SR, Outfielder/Infielder)
Tara Oltmann (TXST, SR, Infielder/Shortstop)
Jayden Mount (ULM, SR, Infielder)
Katie Lively (TROY, SO, Outfielder)

National Softball Signing Day

Roster

Coaching staff

Schedule and results

Schedule Source:
*Rankings are based on the team's current ranking in the NFCA/USA Softball poll.

Austin Regional

Posteason

Conference Accolades 
Player of the Year: Ciara Bryan – LA
Pitcher of the Year: Summer Ellyson – LA
Freshman of the Year: Sara Vanderford – TXST
Newcomer of the Year: Ciara Bryan – LA
Coach of the Year: Gerry Glasco – LA

All Conference First Team
Ciara Bryan (LA)
Summer Ellyson (LA)
Sara Vanderford (TXST)
Leanna Johnson (TROY)
Jessica Mullins (TXST)
Olivia Lackie (USA)
Kj Murphy (UTA)
Katie Webb (TROY)
Jayden Mount (ULM)
Kandra Lamb (LA)
Kendall Talley (LA)
Meredith Keel (USA)
Tara Oltmann (TXST)
Jade Sinness (TROY)
Katie Lively (TROY)

All Conference Second Team
Kelly Horne (TROY)
Meagan King (TXST)
Mackenzie Brasher (USA)
Bailee Wilson (GASO)
Makiya Thomas (CCU)
Kaitlyn Alderink (LA)
Abby Krzywiecki (USA)
Kenzie Longanecker (APP)
Alissa Dalton (LA)
Julie Rawls (LA)
Korie Kreps (ULM)
Kayla Rosado (CCU)
Justice Milz (LA)
Gabby Buruato (APP)
Arieann Bell (TXST)

References:

Rankings

References

Texas State
Texas State Bobcats softball seasons
Texas State Bobcats softball